RawFaith was a wooden sailing vessel built and owned by George McKay in Maine, United States.

Construction
RawFaith was built in Addison, Maine, by  George McKay and his three sons. Construction took 28 months, spread over four years. The construction was performed using a variety of makeshift methods. This was exemplified in the use of a half hull model ship, steam box, the builder's interpretation of 16th-century lines, and other old shipbuilding techniques, but using power tools and laminates to aid in construction and simulate strength. She was constructed of a wide variety of woods and materials, most not normally considered appropriate for marine construction. Rawfaith was not built using shipwrights or naval architects. She was controversial in all aspects and was regarded by most professionals as being very poorly built and designed.

Design
Raw faith was intended to be wheel chair accessible.
The ship was designed by the owner with no previous knowledge of naval architecture. Accordingly, the vessel did not actually resemble any galleon or traditional vessel, and was rigged as a schooner. However, the mast and sail configuration was also atypical.

Purpose
RawFaith was wheelchair accessible, and the intent was to provide free sailing adventures to groups which would normally be deterred from sailing by a member in a wheelchair. Many accessibility features had not yet been installed, though the captain's daughter, a wheelchair user, lived aboard for many months.

Controversy
RawFaith had been the target of criticism for her lack of seaworthiness. She was towed to Rockland, Maine, to undergo repairs.

In another incident on May 9, 2006, all three masts snapped during another storm off the coast of Maine. One of the crew was struck in the head by a piece of the falling mast, but not seriously injured.

Sinking

Two people had been rescued from the ship by a helicopter from Coast Guard Air Station Cape Cod the previous day.

References

External links
Rawfaith homepage
An article from the Working Waterfront Newspaper

Tall ships of the United States
1999 ships
Galleons
Maritime incidents in 2010
Shipwrecks of the Massachusetts coast
Three-masted ships